Church Point is a suburb in the Northern Beaches region of Sydney, in the state of New South Wales, Australia. Church Point is 32 kilometres north of the Sydney central business district, in the local government area of Northern Beaches Council.

History
Thomas Langford was the first settler in the area who acquired  in 1852. The area was originally known as Chapel Point because it was the site of a Wesleyan Chapel built in 1872 on land given by William Oliver.

Early Subdivision Plans

Demographics
According to the 2016 census, there were 997 residents in Church Point. The most common ancestries in Church Point were English 36.3%, Australian 22.9%, Irish 9.9%, Scottish 9.1% and German 2.1%. The median weekly household income was $2,590, much higher than the national median of $1,438. Average monthly mortgage payments were $3,033, compared to the national average of $1,755.

66.1% of people were born in Australia. The next most common country of birth was England at 12.0%.  87.9% of people spoke only English at home. The most common responses for religion in Church Point were No Religion 35.1%, Anglican 22.4% and Catholic 16.4%.

Transport
Pittwater Road is Church Point's main thoroughfare and ends in the suburb.

The Church Point ferry wharf is in McCarrs Creek Road near the post office from where the Church Point Ferry service departs to Scotland Island, Pittwater Youth Hostel, Lovett Bay and Elvina Bay.

References

External links 

Suburbs of Sydney
Northern Beaches Council